is a 2021 Japanese animated fantasy film based on the video game Fate/Grand Order. Part of Type-Moon's Fate franchise, it was produced by CloverWorks and released in cinemas on July 30, 2021.

Plot
  
As Ritsuka and Mash Rayshift to the Singularity, they both see a vision of someone speaking of how they cannot bear the endless suffering of humanity, which they are subjected to due to their clairvoyance exposing them to all the horrors of the past and future. They decide that the only way to rectify the repulsive state of the world is to destroy humanity, and that to achieve this, everything must be redone and perfected from the beginning, from true nothingness. Their plan is to recreate the planet from its very origin, which requires the massive amount energy generated by incinerating all life across 3000 years.

Waking up from the vision, Ritsuka and Mash find they have arrived at Time Temple. Leonardo da Vinci reports a Beast is detected throughout the entire space. Lev Lainur Flauros appears before them, commending Chaldea for getting past the Seventh Singularity while simultaneously expressing surprise and disgust at their persistent survival. When questioned if he had intended to destroy Chaldea and humanity from the very beginning, Lev reveals that he has been serving Solomon for 3000 years: Demon Gods were implanted in mage lineages until they were awakened at their appointed era under their own Grand Order. He was designated to 2016 A.D., and when he awoke as the last Demon God, humanity was incinerated. In turn, Da Vinci reveals that Chaldea survived because Romani Archaman spent a decade preparing for the Incineration of Humanity that he envisioned in a dream, despite not knowing who to trust until Da Vinci's summoning. Lev Lainur had intended to kill Romani with the Control Room explosion, but that plan was thwarted thanks to Ritsuka's accidental intervention.

Unconcerned, as Solomon's final calculations are due to be complete in a matter of hours, Lev transforms into Flauros to stop Ritsuka and Mash from reaching the Throne. The pair kill him, but he is immediately reborn, mocking them as Chaldea is attacked by eight other Demon Gods. The entire space is revealed to be made of Demon Gods, and Flauros asserts that, "As long as the Throne exists, there will always be seventy-two Demon Gods." However, he is thwarted in his next attempt to kill Ritsuka by the sudden arrival of Jeanne d'Arc, who heralds the autonomous summoning of many Heroic Spirits to the Time Temple through their connection with Ritsuka. She rallies the Servants to clear a path to the Throne and they begin to defend Chaldea and engage the Demon Gods, killing the Pillars as endlessly as they can regenerate.

As the Servants aiding Chaldea continue defeating the Demon Gods, Baal asks Solomon to activate Ars Almadel Salomonis to incinerate the Heroic Spirits. Solomon assesses that they would keep returning as long as Ritsuka exists, reflecting the Demon Gods' own immortality as long as Solomon himself exists, and thus they only need to kill Ritsuka.

After conquering the seven terminals protecting Solomon's Throne, Chaldea learn of an eighth terminal and are uncertain how to proceed as the Heroic Spirits who aided Ritsuka and Mash with the previous terminals were connected to the Seven Singularities. They prepare to fight alone, but then Servants from the minor Singularities and Singularity candidates arrive to help them defeat Andromalius and the Demon Gods administrating the Trash Heap.

With the Demon Gods' activity diminished by their constant fighting with the Heroic Spirits, a path opens to the Throne. As Ritsuka and Mash hurry towards the location, Romani reasons that Solomon cannot be a fake, as the Time Temple was created from Solomon's Magic Circuits, and instead deduces something inside Solomon's body is controlling his corpse. After resurrecting his corpse, "Solomon" implanted the Demon Gods in preparation for the Incineration of Humanity. Afterwards, he created the Time Temple, which exists outside time and space, and waited there until the year 2016.

Upon arriving at his throne, "Solomon" announces to Ritsuka and Mash that the final calculations for the First Virtual Noble Phantasm, Ars Nova, are nearly complete. He explains he possesses three Noble Phantasms: the First is Ars Nova, and the Second is the Temple itself, Ars Paulina. The Third is Ars Almadel Salomonis, the light bands in the sky that were created from the energy gathered from incinerating humanity when he fractured history with his Singularities. "Solomon" needs it all to achieve the "ultimate position" and conquer death itself if humans will not. He then fights Ritsuka and Mash, intending to kill the last Master of Humanity as they are the anchor for the Heroic Spirits. Eventually Mash notices a strange reading on his Spirit Origin, and Ritsuka sees that one of his rings differs from the others. Impressed, "Solomon" decides to reveals his true form. As Demon Gods cover the throne, he identifies himself as a Beast of Calamity, the first familiar created by Solomon that served as the foundation for human magecraft. He had ruled alongside Solomon and continued to exist as a primordial curse after Solomon's death, taking took control of Solomon's corpse and incarnating himself through a summoning spell. With his true form unveiled, he identifies himself as Goetia, the Human Order Incineration Ritual and King of Demon Gods, and Beast I.

Goetia declares his plan to travel back to the genesis of the planet and absorb all of its energy to create a new planet without death. The purpose of the Incineration of Humanity was for gathering 3000 years worth of magical energy to accomplish this feat. Ritsuka and Mash attempt to defeat him before he can activate Ars Almadel Salomonis but they are too late. Goetia offers to let Mash join him, believing she would understand his views on death since she was created with a limited lifespan. Mash rejects due to her experiences with Ritsuka, so Goetia launches Ars Almadel Salomis. Mash protects Ritsuka with Lord Camelot, but the heat of Goetia's Noble Phantasm vaporizes her, leaving only her shield.

Goetia prepares to launch his Noble Phantasm again when Romani suddenly arrives. Romani removes his glove to reveal Solomon's tenth ring, which had been sent into the future by Solomon. Marisbury Animusphere had used it as catalyst to summon Solomon in the Holy Grail War of 2004. Romani explains that Solomon's wish on the Grail had been to become human, however, he had foreseen the Incineration of Humanity just as all of his power left him. Romani then manifests as his original self, the true Solomon, having abandoned his wish. Goetia attacks him in fury, but Solomon, with all of his rings present, activates the true Ars Nova. This sacrifices his existence as a Heroic Spirit to remove Goetia's immortality. Before disappearing, Solomon reveals Goetia was originally a spell created to watch over humanity, but Goetia turned away from that duty after seeing humanity's suffering and atrocities. Goetia again attempts to kill Ritsuka to remove the Heroic Spirits, intending to activate Ars Almadel Salomonis before the union of the Demon Gods that comprise him completely collapses.

With Solomon's sacrifice, the Time Temple begins to collapse, and the Demon Gods are thrown into disarray: they either self-destruct, are destroyed by the Heroic Spirits, change side, or flee. Goetia's body begins to crumble away due to Ars Nova destroying the Demon Gods' union. Even when only three Demon Gods remain, he refuses to admit defeat and continues trying to kill Ritsuka. Ritsuka retaliates by protecting themself with Mash's shield and seemingly destroys Goetia with a punch empowered by a Command Spell. They try to hurry back to the Rayshift point but are stopped by Goetia in a human form made from all that remains of the Demon Gods. Now understanding human mentality with his newly gained mortality, Goetia tries to kill Ritsuka to protect his pride. After Ritsuka defeats him, Goetia disappears contently. Ritsuka continues on their way, but the path beneath them collapses before they reach the Rayshift point. However, a revived Mash arrives and saves Ritsuka, and the two returned to Chaldea to celebrate their victory.

Voice Cast

Production and release
The film was revealed as the eighth and final chapter of Fate/Grand Order: Observer on Timeless Temple, covering the events of the Solomon Singularity. CloverWorks, who produced the Fate/Grand Order - Absolute Demonic Front: Babylonia television series, returned to animate the film, so as the main staff from series, with Kinoko Nasu credited for the original script. The film was original released in Japan on July 30, 2021, with Crunchyroll streamed the film on February 18, 2022.

References

External links
 

2021 anime films
Adventure anime and manga
Aniplex
CloverWorks
Fate/stay night anime
Type-Moon
Anime films based on video games